Loren Avedon Rains (born July 30, 1962) is an American martial arts actor best known for his portrayal of Jake Donahue in The King of the Kickboxers and Scott Wylde in No Retreat, No Surrender 2.

Early life
Loren Avedon was born Loren Avedon Rains on July 30, 1962, the son of Burt and Jeanne Avedon (née Rains).
His cousin is the photographer Richard Avedon.

Biography  
Avedon was already in front of the camera in several Carnation commercials at the age of 5. In addition to many appearances in martial arts films like No Retreat, No Surrender 2, No Retreat, No Surrender 3: Blood Brothers and The King of the Kickboxers he also played in television series such as Baywatch Malibu and Thunder in Paradise in some episodes. For the films Deadly Ransom (1998) and The Silent Force (2001), Avedon worked both as an actor and as a co-producer, and on Deadly Ransom as a screenwriter. For the film Tiger Claws III, Avedon stood both as an actor in front of the camera and as an assistant director behind it.

Avedon has a 5th Dan black belt in Taekwondo of the WTF and the 8th Dan black belt Hapkido of the IHA.

Filmography

References

External links 
Official website 

1962 births
Living people
People from Los Angeles
American male film actors
American male taekwondo practitioners
American hapkido practitioners